Beach Handball competition of the 2022 South American Youth Games in Rosario were held from 5 to 8 May at the Arena La Rural.

Participating teams

Men

Women

Medal summary

Men's tournament

Group A

Group B

Knockout stage

Bracket

Placement round

Final ranking

Women's tournament

Group A

Knockout stage

Bracket

Final ranking

References

External links
 2022 South American Youth Games Website

South American Youth Games
2022
South American Youth Games
Beach handball